Comamonas is a genus of bacteria in the phylum Pseudomonadota. Like all Pseudomonadota, they are Gram-negative bacteria. Comamonas species are aerobic organisms and motile using bipolar or polar tufts of one to five flagella. Comamonas testosteroni and Comamonas kerstersii have been found to cause infections in people.

References

External links
 Comamonas J.P. Euzéby: List of Prokaryotic names with Standing in Nomenclature

Comamonadaceae
Bacteria genera